The following lists events that happened during 1824 in Australia.

Incumbents
Monarch - George IV

Governors
Governors of the Australian colonies:
Governor of New South Wales- Major-General Sir Thomas Brisbane
Lieutenant-Governor of Tasmania – Colonel George Arthur

Events
 5 March – The first Chief Justice of the Supreme Court Francis Forbes arrives in Sydney.
 7 May – The Supreme Court of Tasmania, the first of all the State Supreme Courts, is established by Letters Patent.
 17 May – The Supreme Court of New South Wales is created by Letters Patent.
 25 August – The Legislative Council of New South Wales sits for the first time.
 21 October – Joshua John Moore is the first person to take out a ticket-of-occupation for the land which later became the site of Canberra
 Name change from ' New Holland ' to ' Australia ', recommended by Matthew Flinders in 1804, receives official sanction by the United Kingdom.

Exploration and settlement
 12 September – Lieutenant Henry Miller is formally appointed to establish a penal colony at Moreton Bay resulting in the founding of Brisbane on the Brisbane River (Miller had arrived in Moreton Bay a couple of months prior to the formal appointment)
 20 September – James Bremer arrives in Port Essington, in the Northern Territory, but rejects the recommended site as a settlement due to its lack of fresh water. Bremer claims the north coast of Australia from 129° to 135° longitude as British territory. On 21 October Bremer's party establishes a settlement at Fort Dundas on Melville Island.
 28 September – John Oxley recommends a new settlement be founded at Brisbane after finding Moreton Bay unsuitable.
 16 December – Explorers Hamilton Hume and William Hovell arrive in the area Aboriginal people call Corayo on a bay called Jillong.

Arts and literature
 14 October – W. C. Wentworth and Robert Wardell begin publication of The Australian, the first independent newspaper in Australia.

Births
 23 March – John Norton Oxley, New South Wales politician (d. 1891)
 2 May – William Randell, South Australian politician and pioneer (born in the United Kingdom) (d. 1911)

Deaths
 19 July – Alexander Pearce, convict and criminal (born in Ireland) (b. 1790)

References

 
Australia
Years of the 19th century in Australia